John Francis Stevenson (18 March 1888 – 5 December 1951) was an English cricketer.  Stevenson was a right-handed batsman.  He was born at Handsworth, Warwickshire.

Stevenson made a single first-class appearance for Warwickshire against Lancashire at Old Trafford in the 1919 County Championship.  Warwickshire made 259 in their first-innings, with Stevenson being dismissed for a duck by Charlie Hallows.  In response, Lancashire made 490/5 declared in their first-innings, with Warwickshire making 187 in their second-innings, with Stevenson scoring 18 runs before he was dismissed by Lawrence Cook.  Lancashire won the match by an innings and 44 runs.  This was his only major appearance for Warwickshire.

He died at Edgbaston, Warwickshire on 5 December 1951.

References

External links
John Stevenson at ESPNcricinfo

1888 births
1951 deaths
Cricketers from Birmingham, West Midlands
English cricketers
Warwickshire cricketers
Cricketers from Handsworth, West Midlands
English cricketers of 1919 to 1945